Clare Arthur Retan (June 8, 1888July 1, 1931) was a Michigan lawyer.

Early life
Retan was born on June 8, 1888 in Hudson, Michigan to parents Frank Arthur and Florence Agnes Retan.

Education
Retan graduated from the University of Michigan Law School.

Career
Retan, after his graduation, began to practice law. In October 1926, Retan was appointed to the position of Michigan Attorney General by Governor Alex J. Groesbeck, where he served for the rest of the year.

Personal life
Reten married Ferne Inez Listeman in 1923.

Death
Retan died on July 1, 1931 in Windsor, Ontario, Canada.

References

1888 births
1931 deaths
Michigan lawyers
Michigan Republicans
Michigan Attorneys General
University of Michigan Law School alumni
20th-century American politicians
20th-century American lawyers